The 2017–18 SMU Mustangs men's basketball team represents Southern Methodist University during the 2017–18 NCAA Division I men's basketball season. The Mustangs were led by second-year head coach Tim Jankovich and play their home games at Moody Coliseum on their campus in University Park, Texas as members of the American Athletic Conference. They finished the season 17–16, 6–12 in AAC play to finish in ninth place. In the AAC tournament, they defeated UConn before losing to Cincinnati in the quarterfinals.

Previous season
The Mustangs finished the 2015–16 season 30–5, 17–1 in AAC play to win the AAC regular season championship. In the AAC tournament, they defeated East Carolina, UCF, and Cincinnati to win the tournament championship. As a result, they received the conference's automatic bid to the NCAA tournament. As the No. 6 seed in the East region, were upset in the first round by No. 11 USC.

Offseason

Departures

Incoming transfers

2017 recruiting class

2018 recruiting class

Preseason 
At the conference's annual media day, the Mustangs were picked to finish in fourth place in the AAC. Junior guard Shake Milton was named the conference's preseason Player of the Year.

Roster

Schedule and results

|-
!colspan=12 style=| Non-conference regular season

|-
!colspan=6 style=| AAC regular season

|-
!colspan=9 style=| AAC tournament

Source

References

SMU Mustangs men's basketball seasons
Smu